Ayatollah Sayyid Mohammad-Ali Mousavi Jazayeri (born 1941) is an Iranian Twelver Shia cleric, who has been appointed as the representative of Vali-Faqih (Guardianship of the Islamic Jurist) in Khuzestan province by the order of Sayyid Ruhollah Khomeini, who was the previous Supreme Leader of Iran.

He was born in Shushtar, Khuzestan province, Iran. He descends from Nematollah Jazayeri as a prominent Shia scholar. Muhammad Ali Mousavi Jazayeri has studied in seminaries of Qom, Iran under Grand Ayatollah Ruhollah Khomeini and Mohammad Ali Araki; and also in seminaries of Najaf, Iraq under Grand Ayatollah Abu al-Qasim al-Khoei.

Meanwhile, Ayatollah Mousavi Jazayeri is considered as (the permanent) Imam al-Jom'ah of Ahvaz beside other (temporary) Imams of Jom'ah of Ahvaz, including:
 Ayatollah Heidari,
 Ayatollah Hassan zadeh,
 Ayatollah Hajati.

Works
Among his (most important) scholarly works are as follows:

 Theses on justice
 Al-Sawm (fast)

See also

 Nematollah Jazayeri
 Muhammad Jafar Moravej
 Abdul-Nabi Mousavi Fard
 List of Ayatollahs
 Al-Ahvaz TV

References

External links
Biography in Persian
Assembly of Experts for Constitution Profile

Iranian ayatollahs
Iranian Islamists
Shia Islamists
1941 births
Living people
Iranian Arab Islamic scholars
Representatives of the Supreme Leader in the Provinces of Iran
Members of the Assembly of Experts for Constitution
Ayatollahs
People from Shushtar
Iranian people of African descent
Al-Musawi Al-Jazayiri family